Tilemsisuchus is an extinct genus of dyrosaurid crocodyliform which existed in what is now Mali during the Eocene period. It was first named by Eric Buffetaut in 1979 and contains the species Tilemsisuchus lavocati.

References

External links
 Tilemsisuchus at the Paleobiology Database

Eocene crocodylomorphs
Paleocene reptiles of Africa
Prehistoric pseudosuchian genera
Prehistoric marine crocodylomorphs
Taxa named by Éric Buffetaut